The 2013–14 season was Milton Keynes Dons' tenth season in their existence as a professional association football club, and their sixth consecutive season competing in League One. As well as competing in League One, the club also competed in the FA Cup, League Cup and League Trophy.

The season covers the period from 1 July 2013 to 30 June 2014.

Competitions

League One

Final table

Source: Sky Sports

Matches

FA Cup

Matches

League Cup

Matches

League Trophy

Matches

Player details
 Note: Players' ages as of the club's opening fixture of the 2013–14 season.

Transfers

Transfers in

Transfers out

Loans in

Loans out

References

External links

Official Supporters Association website
MK Dons news on MKWeb

Milton Keynes Dons F.C. seasons
Milton Keynes Dons